Carmel Gunning is an Irish composer and musician, from Sligo, Ireland. Gunning is one of Ireland's most accomplished tin whistle players who is also known for her singing and flute playing and also plays guitar and button accordion. Gunning's rich stylised form of whistle playing and tradition stems from her homeland of Geevagh in South County Sligo. This background and tradition aided Gunning's introduction to traditional Irish music which took place at an early age.

Musical beginnings
Gunning was introduced to traditional Irish music as a child when her father, Tom Nangle, would teach her old tunes by lilting or whistling them to her.

In 1969 she sang in her first band, "Carmel and the Chrystals", and played at local dances in Keadue, Geevagh, Boyle and surrounding areas. Playing in the band with Gunning was her brother, Tom Nangle Jnr., Tony Mullaney, Kevin Conlon and his brother. Gunning won the All-Ireland tin whistle slow airs competition at the Fleadh Cheoil in 1976 and senior Scór title for "Music Instrument" section, which incorporates all musical instruments used in traditional Irish music including the fiddle, uilleann pipes, accordion and harp as well as the tin whistle.

Throughout the late 1970s and the 1980s Gunning could be frequently found with P. J. Hernon, Mick Shannon, Joe O'Dowd and others at the famous sessions which took place at the Trades Club in Sligo Town.

Musical style
Gunning is noted for her fast-paced tin whistle style common of fiddle, flute and tin whistle of the "South Sligo" tradition or style. Gunning's reputation in the wider world was expanded by the release of her first solo recording, The Lakes of Sligo, which features four unaccompanied songs as well as 14 tracks of virtuosic tin whistle playing.

A reviewer of her music noted that "no modern tin whistler can escape comparison to Mary Bergin, and Carmel's playing does indeed remind some of the Dublin-born star.  If anything, however, Gunning plays reels with a more insistent headlong drive. Her ornamentation is also more diverse, featuring many tongued triplets in imitation of the bowed embellishments popular among Sligo fiddlers".

Teaching and instructing
Gunning has tutored MA and BA music students at the University of Limerick. She recently celebrated her 45th anniversary as a music teacher in 2014 and has endeavoured to pass on the Sligo musical tradition to younger players. Among former pupils of the Carmel Gunning School of Music is flute and whistle master Liam Kelly of the group Dervish, Orlaith McAuliffe, London, Olivia McTernan and June McCormack among others.

She has played Irish music around the world playing concerts from Norway to Australia and from America to Japan. In 2006, Gunning lead the St. Patrick's Day parade and played a number of concerts in Perth, Australia and in March 2007 she undertook a tour of Massachusetts, USA where she played a various venues giving masterclasses to experienced student and playing concerts.

She is the organiser of Carmel Gunning School of Music, Sligo Town. Gunning founded a summer school festival in the 1990s and it attracts pupils from across Ireland, the United Kingdom, Europe and the United States.

Discography

Albums 
The Lakes of Sligo (1995)
Around St. James's Well (1995)
Carmel Sings Country (2002)
The Sligo Maid (2004)
Lament for the Birds Jack Harte Featured Appearance (2005)
The Sound of Coleman Country Various Artists Featured Appearance (2006)
''Corran Hill'
    Cathair Shligigh.(2019)

Albums and track lists

"Corran Hill", released in 2008. This is Carmel Gunnings 5th solo CD. It is a mixture of contemporary and Irish music and song.

Track list:
Song: Erin Gra Mo Chroi.
Song: An Greasai Brog.
Flings: Were You at the Fair
Song: Donal Og.
Song: Around St. James's Well.
Slow Air:An Chulfhionn.
Song: Katie Daly.
Reels:The Moving Cloud/The Old Bush.
Song: The Exile Far Away.
Reels Jean's Reel/Colonel Frazer's.
Song: The Geevagh Prisoners.
Jigs: Roger Sherlock's/Corran Hill (own composition)

Carmel is accompanied on her CD by Brendan Emmett and Paul Gurney. Special Guest: Orlaith McAuliffe, London.

Books

The book was launched at The Coleman Music Centre, Gurteen, County Sligo. It contains over sixty tunes popular in South Sligo and beyond with design and setting by Adrienne Lee.

Shamrocks from Geevagh . This book of 40 songs was published by Carmel Gunning in 2019.
The Sligo Maid  - this book was published by Carmel Gunning in 2019 and consists of 64 of her compositions to mark her 50th year in the music industry.

Podcast
Interview with Carmel Gunning recorded in May 2010 at http://www.podcasts.ie/featured-musicians/carmel-gunning/

See also
Celtic music
Irish Recorded Music Association
Irish topics
Irish traditional music session

References

External links
Dervish The Sligo-based contemporary Irish music collective.
Celtic Grooves
The Irish Traditional Music Tune Index A searchable database of traditional dance tunes which identifies sources for tunes on commercial recordings and in tune books.
TheSession.org
The Irish Music Review

Year of birth missing (living people)
20th-century Irish women singers
21st-century Irish women singers
Irish flautists
Irish folk singers
Irish songwriters
Irish tin whistle players
Living people
Musicians from County Sligo
Women flautists
20th-century flautists
21st-century flautists